Šerif Hasić (born 7 January 1988) is a Bosnian professional footballer who plays as a centre-back.

Honours
Mladost Doboj Kakanj
 First League of FBiH: 2014–15

References

External links
 

1988 births
Living people
Sportspeople from Zenica
Association football central defenders
Bosnia and Herzegovina footballers
Bosnia and Herzegovina under-21 international footballers
NK Čelik Zenica players
NK Junak Sinj players
FK Sloboda Tuzla players
SC Kriens players
FK Novi Pazar players
NK Zvijezda Gradačac players
FK Mladost Doboj Kakanj players
FK Rudar Kakanj players
NK Bratstvo Gračanica players
NK TOŠK Tešanj players
PSM Makassar players
NK Vis Simm-Bau players
Tadamon Sour SC players
Premier League of Bosnia and Herzegovina players
Swiss Challenge League players
Serbian First League players
First League of the Federation of Bosnia and Herzegovina players
Liga 1 (Indonesia) players

Bosnia and Herzegovina expatriate footballers
Expatriate footballers in Croatia
Bosnia and Herzegovina expatriate sportspeople in Croatia
Expatriate footballers in Serbia
Bosnia and Herzegovina expatriate sportspeople in Serbia
Expatriate footballers in Switzerland
Bosnia and Herzegovina expatriate sportspeople in Switzerland
Expatriate footballers in Indonesia
Bosnia and Herzegovina expatriate sportspeople in Indonesia
Expatriate footballers in Lebanon
Bosnia and Herzegovina expatriate sportspeople in Lebanon